Charlie Coffey is an American writer, actor and producer. Coffey is best known for his collaborations with comedian Julie Brown on such projects as Just Say Julie, The Homecoming Queen's Got A Gun, Strip Mall and Earth Girls Are Easy.

References

External links

American television writers
American male screenwriters
American television producers
American male television actors
American male television writers
Living people
Year of birth missing (living people)